Mariella Mularoni (born 15 October 1962) is a Sammarinese politician and one of the Captains Regent with Luca Boschi from 1 October 2019 until 1 April 2020.

Life
Mularoni is an English language teacher and is a mother of two daughters. She joined the Christian Democratic Party in 1994 and has served as a member of the Grand and General Council for two consecutive elections since 2013.

References

1962 births
Living people
People from the City of San Marino
21st-century women politicians
Captains Regent of San Marino
Members of the Grand and General Council
Female heads of state
Sammarinese Christian Democratic Party politicians
Sammarinese women in politics